Krahmer is a surname. Notable people with the surname include:

Carlo Krahmer (1914–1976), British jazz drummer and record producer
Holger Krahmer (born 1970), German politician and Member of the European Parliament with the Free Democratic Party of Germany

See also
Carel Frederik Krahmer de Bichin (1787–1830), Dutch artillery officer
Kramer (disambiguation)